The Hunter 336 is an American sailboat that was designed by Rob Mazza as coastal cruising boat and first built in 1995.

The Hunter 336 is a development of the smaller Hunter 29.5.

Production
The design was built by Hunter Marine in the United States, but it is now out of production.

Design
The Hunter 336 was designed as a larger twin cabin version of the Hunter 29.5, with a market of owners moving up from smaller sailboats. It is a recreational keelboat, built predominantly of fiberglass, with wood trim. It has a fractional sloop B&R rig, a slightly raked stem, a walk-through reverse transom, an internally-mounted spade-type rudder controlled by a wheel  and a fixed fin keel. It displaces  and carries  of ballast.

Operational history
Burns noted the sailing qualities, "The fractional rig points pretty well. We were around the high 30’s to 40 degrees apparent even in the very light stuff. The power is in the main. Since the spreaders are angled aft to eliminate the backstay, vang trimming for good sail shape is essential. The main also has lazyjacks which make it easy to take the main down or reef it with only one other person aboard. Hunter has made this boat easy to handle by a couple and single handling should be easy as well." Of the interior he wrote, "Like all modern Hunters, the Hunter 336 has a light, airy look and feel. The 336 comes in two layouts to fit the boat owner’s needs. The first has a large open salon with a full wrap around settee and open forward V-berth with curtains. This is designed for folks who only occasionally have sleep over guests. It is ideal for entertaining below. The second layout below offers an enclosed forward stateroom for family or friends. This second version is preferred by several charter companies. There are a fair amount of teak and ash accents below."

A 2003 review on Boats.com noted that the design is fast in light air and also praised the interior. It states, "Our performance in the day's conditions quickly erased any prior doubts I had held about the 336's unconventional rig and sailplan. In fact, by the end of our sail Bergstrom's elegant tapered, fractional spar was amongst my favorite features of the boat. Without a backstay I hypothesized that in 20-knots apparent the forestay would be sagging like a wet noodle. To my surprise however, the furler's extrusions were deflected by no more than a few inches." On the interior the writer said, "Down below the 336 has a airy and open two cabin layout. The Hunter is, as Lamia Charlebois observed, like a "condo"—perfect for entertaining or enjoying a sit-down meal with two other couples. There are so many opening windows and hatches (11 in total) that I felt for a moment, albeit brief, that I was inside a solarium and not a cabin."

See also
List of sailing boat types

Related development
Hunter 29.5
Hunter 340

Similar sailboats
Abbott 33
C&C 3/4 Ton
C&C 33
C&C 101
C&C SR 33
CS 33
Endeavour 33
Hunter 33
Hunter 33-2004
Hunter 33.5
Marlow-Hunter 33
Mirage 33
Moorings 335
Nonsuch 33
Tanzer 10
Viking 33

References

Keelboats
1990s sailboat type designs
Sailing yachts
Sailboat type designs by Rob Mazza
Sailboat types built by Hunter Marine